National Football League coaches may refer to:

List of current National Football League head coaches
List of National Football League head coaches
List of current National Football League staffs